HR 5401 is a possible astrometric binary star system in the southern constellation of Lupus. With an apparent visual magnitude of 5.83, it is just visible to the naked eye under good seeing conditions. It is moving closer to Earth with a heliocentric radial velocity of −30 km/s, and is expected to come within  in ~524,000 years.

This is an Am star with a stellar classification of A1m A5/7-F2. Lu (1991) lists it as a likely dwarf barium star. It is radiating 13 times the Sun's luminosity from its photosphere at an effective temperature of 7,300 K. This system is a source of X-ray emission which may be coming from the companion.

HR 5401 has two visual companions. Component B is a magnitude 11.50 star at an angular separation of  along a position angle (PA) of 114°, as of 1999.

References

Am stars
Astrometric binaries
Lupus (constellation)
Durchmusterung objects
126504
070663
5401